Nikala Smith (born 26 January 1987) is a former Australian netball player in the ANZ Championship, playing for the West Coast Fever. Smith played 56 games in the Commonwealth Bank Trophy, as a member of the Perth Orioles (2003–05, 2007) and the AIS Canberra Darters (2006). Her career peaked when she won a premiership with the side voted the best in Australian indoor netball history, the Spinning Snap Kicks.

References
2009 West Coast Fever player profile. Retrieved on 2009-03-29.
2008 West Coast Fever team profile. Retrieved on 2008-07-15.

1987 births
Living people
Australian netball players
West Coast Fever players
ANZ Championship players
Perth Orioles players
AIS Canberra Darters players
Western Sting players
Australian Netball League players
Netball players from Western Australia